Agapeta largana is a species of moth of the  family Tortricidae. It is found on Crete and in France, Austria, Slovenia, Albania, Hungary, Bulgaria, Romania and Greece. It occurs in wet, sandy habitats.

The wingspan is 16–23 mm. Adults have been recorded on wing from May to July.

References

External links

Lepiforum.de

Moths described in 1906
Cochylini
Taxa named by Hans Rebel
Moths of Europe